Arkless is a surname. Notable people with the surname include:

Brede Arkless (1939–2006), British rock climber and mountaineer
David Arkless (born 1954), British businessman
Richard Arkless (born 1975), British politician

See also
Harkless